= Luis Tijerina Almaguer =

Mexican educator, politician, and poet

- Born: 21 October 1897; Monterrey, Nuevo León, Mexico
- Died: August 18, 1978 (aged 80)
- Occupations: Teacher, politician, poet

Luis Tijerina Almaguer (born 21 August, 1897) was a Mexican educator, civil servant, writer, poet, and politician.
